This is a list of productions  at the Innsbruck Festival of Early Music since 1977. It includes operas,  oratorios and other staged or semi-staged vocal works. Since 2011, one of the festival's annual opera productions has been designated "Baroque Opera: Young" ("Barockoper: Jung"). The casts of these productions feature selected finalists from the previous year's Cesti Competition.

1977 – 1989

 Georg Friedrich Handel: Acis and Galatea (1977)
 Johann Joseph Fux: Psyche (1978)
 Georg Friedrich Handel: Israel in Egypt (oratorio) (1978)
 Alessandro Stradella: Susanna (oratorio) (1979)
 Georg Friedrich Handel: L'Allegro, il Penseroso ed il Moderato (pastoral ode) (1979)
 Claudio Monteverdi: L'incoronazione di Poppea (1980)
 Stefano Landi: Il Sant' Alessio (1981)
 Pietro Antonio Cesti: Orontea (1982)
 Georg Friedrich Handel: Ariodante (1982)
 Pietro Antonio Cesti: Il Tito (1983)
 Georg Friedrich Handel: Rodrigo (1984)
 Christoph Willibald Gluck: Armide (1985)
 Francesco Cavalli: Xerse (1985)
 Francesco Cavalli: Pulcheria (1986)
 Francesco Cavalli: L'Orontea (1986)
 Johann Wolfgang Franck: Die drey Töchter Cecrops (1987)
 Pietro Antonio Cesti: Semiramide (1987)
 Francesco Cavalli: Giasone (1988)
 Alessandro Scarlatti: Gli equivoci nel sembiante (1988)
 Alessandro Stradella: San Giovanni Battista (oratorio) (1988)
 Georg Friedrich Handel: Flavio (1989)

1990 – 1999
 
 Claudio Monteverdi: L'incoronazione di Poppea (1990)
 Pietro Antonio Cesti: Orontea (1990)
 Henry Purcell: Dido and Aeneas (1990)
 Georg Friedrich Handel: Serse (1991)
 Wolfgang Amadeus Mozart: La finta semplice (1991)
 Francesco Bartolomeo Conti: Don Chisciotte in Sierra Morena (1992)
 Georg Friedrich Handel: Alcina (1992)
 Antonio Caldara: I Disingannati (1993)
 Claudio Monteverdi: Il ritorno d'Ulisse in patria (1993)
 Heinrich Ignaz Franz Biber: Arminio (1994)
 Georg Philipp Telemann: Orpheus (1994)
 Henry Purcell: Dido and Aeneas (1995)
 John Blow: Venus and Adonis (1995)
 Alessandro Scarlatti: Mitridate Eupatore (1995)
 Pietro Antonio Cesti: L'Argia (1996)
 Johann Adolph Hasse: Solimano (1997)
 Florian Leopold Gassmann: L'opera seria (1997)
 Georg Friedrich Handel: Semele (1998)
 Marc-Antoine Charpentier: Les plaisirs de Versailles (1998)
 Claudio Monteverdi: La guerra d'amore (based on madrigals from the 7th and 8th Madrigal Books and Scherzi Musicali) (1999)
 Domenico Mazzocchi: La catena d'Adone (1999)

2000 – 2009

 Giovanni Legrenzi: La divisione del mondo (2000)
 Antonio Maria Abbatini: Dale male il bene (2001)
 Joseph Haydn: Il mondo della luna (2001)
 Georg Friedrich Handel: Rinaldo (2002)
 Claudio Monteverdi: L'Orfeo (2003)
 Francesco Cavalli: Eliogabalo (2004)
 Antonio Sartorio: Giulio Cesare in Egitto (2004)
 Francesco Bartolomeo Conti: Don Chisciotte in Sierra Morena (2005)
 Wolfgang Amadeus Mozart: Don Giovanni (2006)
 Wolfgang Amadeus Mozart: Il re pastore (2006)
 Georg Friedrich Handel: Acis and Galatea (2007)
 Georg Philipp Telemann: Der geduldige Sokrates (2007)
 Bernardo Pasquini: Sant' Agnese (oratorio) (2008)
 Georg Friedrich Handel: Belshazzar (oratorio) (2008) 
 Joseph Haydn: Orlando paladino (2009)
 Joseph Haydn: L'isola disabitata (2009)

2010 – 2019

 Antonio Vivaldi: Ottone in Villa (2010)
 Giovanni Battista Pergolesi: L'Olimpiade (2010)
 Francesco Cavalli: La Calisto ("Baroque Opera: Young" production) (2011)
 Johann Adolph Hasse: Romolo ed Ersilia (2011)
 Georg Philipp Telemann: Flavius Bertaridus (2011)
 Francesco Provenzale: La Stellidaura vendicante (2012)
 Domenico Scarlatti: La Dirindina (2012)
 Giovanni Andrea Bontempi: Il Paride (2012)
 Claudio Monteverdi: L'incoronazione di Poppea ("Baroque Opera: Young" production) (2012)
 Wolfgang Amadeus Mozart: La clemenza di Tito (2013)
 Giulio Caccini and Jacopo Peri: Euridice (2013)
 Henry Purcell: Dido and Aeneas / John Blow: Venus and Adonis ("Baroque Opera: Young" production) (2013)
 Georg Friedrich Handel: Almira (2014)
 Domenico Scarlatti: Narciso (2014)
 Antonio Cesti: Orontea ("Baroque Opera: Young" production) (2014)
 Nicola Porpora: Germanico in Germania (2015)
 Jean-Baptiste Lully: Armide ("Baroque Opera: Young" production) (2015)
 Gluck Alceste René Jacobs (2016)
 Cesti Le nozze in sogno Enrico Onofri (2016)
 Cimarosa Il matrimonio segreto Alessandro De Marchi (2016)
 Claudio Monteverdi Il ritorno d'Ulisse in patria Alessandro De Marchi (2017)
 Rameau Pygmalion (Rameau) Les Talens Lyriques Christophe Rousset (2017)
 Reinhard Keiser Die römische Unruhe, oder Die edelmütgie Octavia, Singspiel Jörg Halubeck (2017)
 Hasse Semele (Hasse) Claudio Osele (2018)
 Cavalli Apollo e Dafne (Cavalli) Massimiliano Toni (2018) 
 Mercadante Didone abbandonata (Mercadante) Alessandro De Marchi (2018)
 Broschi Merope (opera) Alessandro De Marchi (2019)
 Handel Ottone, Rè di Germania Fabrizio Ventura (2019)
 Cesti La Dori Ottavio Dantone (2019)

2020 - 
Ferdinando Paër Leonora Alessandro De Marchi (2020)
Intermedii for La Pellegrina Eduardo Egüez (2020)
Melani L'empio punito Mariangiola Martello (2020)
Bernardo Pasquini, L'Idalma Alessandro De Marchi (2021) 
Johann Mattheson, Boris Goudenow Concerto Theresia (2021)
Telemann, Pastorelle en musique Ensemble 1700, Dorothee Oberlinger (2021)
Carl Heinrich Graun Silla (Graun) Alessandro De Marchi (2022)
Giovanni Bononcini Astarto Stefano Montanari  (2022)
Carlo Pallavicino L’amazzone corsara Luca Quintavalle  (2022)

References 

Innsbruck
Innsbruck